The 1980 Australian Drivers' Championship was a CAMS sanctioned Australian motor racing title for drivers of Australian Formula 1 racing cars. The winner of the championship, which was the 24th Australian Drivers' Championship, was awarded the 1980 CAMS Gold Star.

The championship was won by Alfredo Costanzo driving a Lola T430 Chevrolet.

Calendar

The title was contested over an eight-round series with one race per round.

Class Structure
Australian Formula 1, in its 1980 incarnation, catered for cars complying with any one of the following three Formulae:
 Formula 5000
 International Formula One
 Formula Pacific
For championship points allocation purposes, cars competed in two classes:
 Over 1600cc: Open to "Formula 5000" cars and "International Formula One" cars
 Under 1600cc: Open to "Formula Pacific" cars

Points system
Championship points were awarded on a 9-6-4-3-2-1 basis to the top six Australian license holders in each class at each round.
Bonus points were awarded on a 4-3-2-1 basis to the top four Australian license holders at each round, regardless of class.

Results

The following drivers were not eligible for championship points as they were not Australian license holders.
 Guy Edwards (Fittipaldi F5A), who finished second at Round 1
 Alan Jones (Williams FW07B Ford), who won the Australian Grand Prix
 Bruno Giacomelli (Alfa Romeo 179), who finished second in the Australian Grand Prix
 Didier Pironi (Elfin MR8 Chevrolet), who finished third in the Australian Grand Prix

References

Further reading
 The official 50-year history of the Australian Grand Prix, 1986, pages 436-444

External links
 1980 Australian "Formula 5000" images, www.autopics.com.au

Australian Drivers' Championship
Drivers' Championship